Eden Park is a sports stadium in Auckland, New Zealand, it has a capacity of 50,000. The ground has hosted Test cricket since its first match in 1930 when New Zealand played England. 49 Test matches have been played at the ground along with 71 One Day Internationals (ODIs), the first of which was in 1976 when New Zealand played India.

Englishman Ted Bowley became the first man to score a Test century at Eden Park when he made 109 against New Zealand in 1930. Barry Sinclair's innings of 138 against South Africa in 1964 was the first time a New Zealand player made a century at the ground. Wally Hammond's score of 336 not out, made against New Zealand in 1933, remains the highest score seen at the ground. At the time Hammond's score was also a world record, surpassing Donald Bradman's record of 334. 4 players have made a double century at the ground, however, the highest score by a New Zealander, 173 from 136 deliveries, was made by Ian Smith against India in 1990. John Wright is the only man to have scored three Test centuries at the ground. In a match against England in 1978 Geoff Howarth scored centuries in both innings. This feat was repeated by Peter Fulton in 2013.

Twenty five ODI centuries have been scored at Eden Park, the first by Australian Greg Chappell who scored 108 from 92 deliveries against New Zealand in 1982. The highest score achieved at the ground is unbeaten 146 made by Marcus Stoinis against New Zealand in 2017. Martin Crowe and Nathan Astle are the only players to record two ODI centuries at the ground.

New Zealand opener Martin Guptill scored the only Twenty20 International century at Eden Park. He scored 105 runs against Australia on 16 February 2018 and became the highest run scorer in all T20Is as well. Despite his innings, New Zealand lost the match.

Key
 * denotes that the batsman was not out.
 Inns. denotes the number of the innings in the match.
 Balls denotes the number of balls faced in an innings.
 NR denotes that the number of balls was not recorded.
 Parentheses next to the player's score denotes his century number at Eden Park.
 The column title Date refers to the date the match started.
 The column title Result refers to whether the player's team won, lost or if the match was drawn or a no result.

Test centuries

The following table summarises the Test centuries scored at Eden Park.

One Day International centuries

The following table summarises the One Day International centuries scored at Eden Park.

Twenty20 International centuries

The following table summarises the Twenty20 International centuries scored at Eden Park.

References 

Eden Park
Cricket grounds in New Zealand
Centuries
Auckland cricket grounds